Dalophia ellenbergeri is a species of amphisbaenian in the family Amphisbaenidae. The species is native to southern Africa.

Etymology
The specific name, ellenbergeri, is in honor of Victor Ellenberger (1879–1972), who was an African-born Swiss missionary and naturalist.

Geographic range
D. ellenbergeri is found in Angola and Zambia.

Habitat
The preferred natural habitat of D. ellenbergeri is savanna.

Behavior
D. ellenbergeri is terrestrial and fossorial.

Reproduction
D. ellenbergeri is oviparous.

References

Further reading
Angel F (1920). "Liste de reptiles du Haut-Zambèze et de l'Afrique australe. Description d'une espèce nouvelle du genre Monopeltis". Bulletin du Muséum National d'Histoire Naturelle, Paris 26 (7): 614–617. (Monopeltis ellenbergeri, new species, pp. 615–616, Figures 1–2). (in French).
Broadley DG, Gans C, Visser J (1976). "Studies on Amphisbaenians (Amphisbaenia, Reptilia). 6. The Genera Monopeltis and Dalophia in Southern Africa". Bulletin of the American Museum of Natural History 157 (5): 311–486. (Dalophia ellenbergeri, pp. 451–454, Figures 116–121).
Gans C (2005). "Checklist and Bibliography of the Amphisbaenia of the World". Bull. American Mus. Nat. Hist. (289): 1–130. (Dalophia ellenbergeri, p. 30).

Dalophia
Reptiles described in 1920
Taxa named by Fernand Angel